The women's 4 × 100 metres relay event at the 1986 Commonwealth Games was held on 2 August at the Meadowbank Stadium in Edinburgh.

Results

References

Relay
1990